Basilisa Ygnalaga (born 30 June 1967) is a Filipino archer. She competed in the women's individual event at the 1988 Summer Olympics.

References

1967 births
Living people
Filipino female archers
Olympic archers of the Philippines
Archers at the 1988 Summer Olympics
Place of birth missing (living people)